Acomb is a village in the south of Northumberland, England. The population at the 2001 Census was 1,184 increasing to 1,268 at the 2011 Census. It is situated to the north of Hexham, not far from the junction of the A69 road and A6079 road. The name is Anglo-Saxon Old English acum, 'at the oak trees'. The traditional pronunciation of the name is "Yeckam".

History
Some Bronze Age cists have been discovered in this vicinity. 
Hadrian's Wall runs about 1 mile (1.5 km) to the NE of Acomb, where the site of Chesters Roman Fort is located.

Governance 
Acomb is in the parliamentary constituency of Hexham.

Economy 
In this area there was much mining and quarrying. The coal mine at Acomb in 1886 employed 200 workers and 51,000 tons of coal per annum were raised. It was good coking coal and 41 coke ovens were in use. At Fallowfield then still working was another lead mine, where the Romans had mined and quarried. In 1886 the mine employed 120 men, mining lead and barites.

Religious sites 
The pleasing church of St John Lee on the hillside amid the trees is dedicated to St John of Beverley, a local hermit and supposedly worker of miracles. There was a medieval church, but it was rebuilt in 1818 by Dobson and in 1885 enlarged by Hicks, so that it has a tower with spire — a landmark that can be seen from Warden, Hexham and all around. In 1765 at St John Lee Church a most remarkable marriage was celebrated. The bridegroom was Robert Scott, a well-known Northumbrian piper. He was 90 years old and for 26 years he had moved about on crutches. His bride, Jean Middlemas, was only 25 years old and might be regarded as destined to be a nurse to an antique husband. But on his wedding day, he threw his crutches away and walked from the village of Wall, where he lived, to the church. He walked back again among a group of fellow pipers. At the conclusion of the marriage, they were regaled with cakes and ale. Was this a miracle by St John of Beverley?

References

External links

GENUKI
Northumberland Communities

Villages in Northumberland
Civil parishes in Northumberland